The 1997 NBA All-Star Game was the 47th edition of the All-Star Game and commemorated the 50th anniversary of NBA. The game was played on February 9, 1997, at Gund Arena (now known as Rocket Mortgage FieldHouse) in Cleveland. The winner of the MVP award was Glen Rice of the Charlotte Hornets who played 25 minutes and scored 26 points while breaking two records in the process, 20 points in the third quarter and 24 points in the second half. Rice's 20 points in the period broke Hal Greer's record (19), set in 1968. Rice's 24 points in a half surpassed the previous mark of 23, owned by Wilt Chamberlain and Tom Chambers. Michael Jordan's 14 points, 11 rebounds, and 11 assists were the first and until the 2011 NBA All-Star Game the only triple-double in NBA All-Star Game history; LeBron James (2011), Dwyane Wade (2012), and Kevin Durant (2017) have also achieved this. Five players (Charles Barkley, Alonzo Mourning, Patrick Ewing, Clyde Drexler, Shaquille O'Neal) who were voted or selected for the team opted out due to injury, opening the doors for the annually neglected and the new stars—Joe Dumars, Detlef Schrempf, Chris Webber, Chris Gatling and 20-year-old second-year man Kevin Garnett took their spots.

For this NBA All-Star Game and the next four games that were played (1998, 2000–02), no special uniforms were issued, and the players simply wore the uniforms from their respective teams, a similar approach that used to be used by Major League Baseball for its All-Star Game. The halftime show featured a ceremony honoring the 50 Greatest Players in NBA History. Of the 50 players named, three were not present: Pete Maravich, who died in 1988, Shaquille O'Neal, who was recovering from a knee injury, and Jerry West, who was having surgery for an ear infection.

Roster

 Charles Barkley, Clyde Drexler, Patrick Ewing, Alonzo Mourning, and Shaquille O'Neal were unable to participate due to injury. Dikembe Mutombo replaced Ewing in the East starting lineup, and Karl Malone replaced Barkley in the West starting lineup. Barkley,  Drexler, and Ewing were present, however, for the halftime ceremony.
 Detlef Schrempf, Chris Gatling, Chris Webber, Joe Dumars, and Kevin Garnett were chosen to replace Charles Barkley, Clyde Drexler, Patrick Ewing, Alonzo Mourning, and Shaquille O'Neal, respectively.

Score by quarters

 
Halftime— West, 60–57
Third Quarter— East, 97–87
Technical Fouls— none
Officials— Hugh Evans, Bill Oakes, Ron Garretson
Attendance— 20,562
Time – 2:26
Rating— 11.2/19 share (NBC).

Three-point shootout

Slam Dunk Competition

Rookie Challenge
4th NBA Rookie Challenge Game. Date: February 8, 1997, at Gund Arena in Cleveland; Coaches: Eastern Conference: Red Auerbach; Western Conference: Red Holzman; MVP: Allen Iverson, Philadelphia (26 minutes, 19 points).

Team replacements: EAST— None ; WEST— ?? for Minnesota guard Stephon Marbury, ?? for Dallas forward Samaki Walker.

Western Conference

Eastern Conference

Score by periods
 

Officials: Nolan Fine, Bill Spooner, Michael Smith.

References

External links
 1997 NBA All-Star Game Box Score
 1997 NBA Rookie Challenge Game Box Score
 1997 NBA All-Star Game Article

National Basketball Association All-Star Game
All-Star
1997 in sports in Ohio
Basketball competitions in Cleveland